Eupithecia picada is a moth in the family Geometridae. It is found in the regions of Biobio (Nuble Province), Araucania (Cautin Province) and Los Lagos (Valdivia, Osorno, Llanquihue, and Chiloe provinces) in Chile. The habitat consists of the Northern Valdivian Forest and the Valdivian Forest biotic provinces.

The length of the forewings is about 10.5 mm for males and 9–11 mm for females. The forewings are variegated with pale grey, pale yellowish brown and dark brown scales. The hindwings are greyish white with greyish brown scaling distally and dark brown scaling along the anal margin. Adults have been recorded on wing in December, January, February and March.

Etymology
The specific name is based on the type locality.

References

Moths described in 1987
picada
Moths of South America
Endemic fauna of Chile